Princess Xenia may refer to:

 Princess Xenia of Montenegro
 Princess Xenia Andreevna of Russia
 Princess Xenia Georgievna of Russia

See also
 Grand Duchess Xenia Alexandrovna of Russia
 Xenia Borisovna of Russia
 Xenia of Tarusa
 Xenia (name)